Gusyok is a rural locality (a village) in Malyshevskoye Rural Settlement, Selivanovsky District, Vladimir Oblast, Russia. The population was 7 as of 2010.

Geography 
Gusyok is located on the Ushna River, 41 km southwest of Krasnaya Gorbatka (the district's administrative centre) by road. Staroye Bibeyevo is the nearest rural locality.

References 

Rural localities in Selivanovsky District